Isabella Bozicevic (born 12 November 2001) is an Australian tennis player.

Bozicevic has a career high WTA singles ranking of 845, achieved on 24 June 2019. She also has a career high doubles ranking of 437, achieved on 18 November 2019.

Bozicevic made her WTA Tour main-draw debut at the 2022 Sydney International, where she received a wildcard into the doubles draw partnering Alexandra Osborne.

She is the cousin of fellow tennis player Ajla Tomljanović.

ITF Circuit finals

Doubles: 2 (2 runner–ups)

References

External links
 
 

2001 births
Living people
Australian female tennis players
Tennis people from the Gold Coast
Australian people of Croatian descent